Hoploparia longimana is a species of fossil lobsters belonging to the family Nephropidae. It is the type species of the genus Hoploparia.

These epifaunal carnivores lived during the Cretaceous of Argentina and the Netherlands and Poland, from 139.8 to 66 Ma.

References

True lobsters
Late Cretaceous crustaceans
Early Cretaceous arthropods of Europe
Fossils of the Netherlands
Fossils of Argentina
Early Cretaceous animals of South America
Cretaceous arthropods of South America
Late Cretaceous arthropods of Europe
Early Cretaceous crustaceans
Fossil taxa described in 1826
Fossils of Poland
Cretaceous Argentina
Cretaceous Poland
Valanginian species first appearances
Maastrichtian species extinctions
Hauterivian species
Albian species
Barremian species
Aptian species
Cenomanian species
Turonian species
Santonian species
Coniacian species
Campanian species